Wen Tianpeng (born 9 June 1997) is a Chinese footballer currently playing as a forward for Quanzhou Yassin, on loan from Chongqing Lifan.

Club career
Wen Tianpeng would play for Shenyang Dongjin before being signed by top tier club Chongqing Lifan on 4 July 2019. He would go on to make his debut for Chongqing on 27 July 2019 in a league game against Hebei China Fortune F.C. in a 3-0 defeat.

Career statistics

References

External links

1997 births
Living people
Chinese footballers
Association football forwards
Shenyang Dongjin players
Chongqing Liangjiang Athletic F.C. players
Chinese Super League players
China League Two players